The Contras (from ) were the various U.S.-backed and funded right-wing rebel groups that were active from 1979 to 1990 in opposition to the Marxist Sandinista Junta of National Reconstruction Government in Nicaragua, which came to power in 1979 following the Nicaraguan Revolution. Among the separate contra groups, the Nicaraguan Democratic Force (FDN) emerged as the largest by far. In 1987, virtually all Contra organizations were united, at least nominally, into the Nicaraguan Resistance.

During their war against the Nicaraguan government, the Contras committed numerous human rights violations and used terrorist tactics. These actions were frequently carried out systematically as a part of the strategy of the Contras. Supporters of the Contras tried to downplay these violations, particularly the Reagan administration in the U.S., which engaged in a campaign of white propaganda to alter public opinion in favor of the Contras, while covertly encouraging the Contras to attack civilian targets.

From an early stage, the rebels received financial and military support from the United States government, and their military significance decisively depended on it. After U.S. support was banned by Congress, the Reagan administration covertly continued it. These illegal activities culminated in the Iran–Contra affair.

History

Origins
The Contras were not a monolithic group, but a combination of three distinct elements of Nicaraguan society:

 Ex-guardsmen of the Nicaraguan National Guard and other right-wing figures who had fought for Nicaragua's ex-dictator Somoza—these later were especially found in the military wing of the Nicaraguan Democratic Force (FDN). Remnants of the Guard later formed groups such as the Fifteenth of September Legion, the Anti-Sandinista Guerrilla Special Forces, and the National Army of Liberation. Initially however, these groups were small and conducted little active raiding into Nicaragua.
 Anti-Somozistas who had supported the revolution but felt betrayed by the Sandinista government – e.g. Edgar Chamorro, prominent member of the political directorate of the FDN, or Jose Francisco Cardenal, who had briefly served in the Council of State before leaving Nicaragua out of disagreement with the Sandinista government's policies and founding the Nicaraguan Democratic Union (UDN), an opposition group of Nicaraguan exiles in Miami. Another example are the MILPAS (Milicias Populares Anti-Sandinistas), peasant militias led by disillusioned Sandinista veterans from the northern mountains. Even after his death, other MILPAS bands sprouted during 1980–1981.
Nicaraguans who had avoided direct involvement in the revolution but opposed the Sandinistas.

Main groups

The CIA and Argentine intelligence, seeking to unify the anti-Sandinista cause before initiating large-scale aid, persuaded 15 September Legion, the UDN and several former smaller groups to merge in September 1981 as the Nicaraguan Democratic Force (Fuerza Democrática Nicaragüense, FDN). Although the FDN had its roots in two groups made up of former National Guardsmen (of the Somoza regime), its joint political directorate was led by businessman and former anti-Somoza activist Adolfo Calero Portocarrero. Edgar Chamorro later stated that there was strong opposition within the UDN against working with the Guardsmen and that the merging only took place because of insistence by the CIA.

Based in Honduras, Nicaragua's northern neighbor, under the command of former National Guard Colonel Enrique Bermúdez, the new FDN commenced to draw in other smaller insurgent forces in the north. Largely financed, trained, equipped, armed and organized by the U.S., it emerged as the largest and most active contra group.

In April 1982, Edén Pastora (Comandante Cero), one of the heroes in the fight against Somoza, organized the Sandinista Revolutionary Front (FRS) – embedded in the Democratic Revolutionary Alliance (ARDE) – and declared war on the Sandinista government. Himself a former Sandinista who had held several high posts in the government, he had resigned abruptly in 1981 and defected, believing that the newly found power had corrupted the Sandinista's original ideas. A popular and charismatic leader, Pastora initially saw his group develop quickly. He confined himself to operate in the southern part of Nicaragua; after a press conference he was holding on 30 May 1984 was bombed, he "voluntarily withdrew" from the contra struggle.

A third force, Misurasata, appeared among the Miskito, Sumo and Rama Amerindian peoples of Nicaragua's Atlantic coast, who in December 1981 found themselves in conflict with the authorities following the government's efforts to nationalize Indian land. In the course of this conflict, forced removal of at least 10,000 Indians to relocation centers in the interior of the country and subsequent burning of some villages took place. The Misurasata movement split in 1983, with the breakaway Misura group of Stedman Fagoth Muller allying itself more closely with the FDN, and the rest accommodating themselves with the Sandinistas: On 8 December 1984 a ceasefire agreement known as the Bogota Accord was signed by Misurasata and the Nicaraguan government. A subsequent autonomy statute in September 1987 largely defused Miskito resistance.

Unity efforts
U.S. officials were active in attempting to unite the Contra groups. In June 1985 most of the groups reorganized as the United Nicaraguan Opposition (UNO), under the leadership of Adolfo Calero, Arturo Cruz and Alfonso Robelo, all originally supporters of the anti-Somoza revolution. After UNO's dissolution early in 1987, the Nicaraguan Resistance (RN) was organized along similar lines in May.

U.S. military and financial assistance

In front of the International Court of Justice, Nicaragua claimed that the contras were altogether a creation of the U.S. This claim was rejected. However, the evidence of a very close relationship between the contras and the United States was considered overwhelming and incontrovertible. The U.S. played a very large role in financing, training, arming, and advising the contras over a long period, and it is unlikely that the contras would have been capable of carrying out significant military operations without this support, given the large amount of training and weapons shipments that the Sandinistas had received from Havana and Moscow.

Political background

The US government viewed the leftist Sandinistas as a threat to economic interests of American corporations in Nicaragua and to national security. US President Ronald Reagan stated in 1983 that "The defense of [the USA's] southern frontier" was at stake. "In spite of the Sandinista victory being declared fair, the United States continued to oppose the left-wing Nicaraguan government." and opposed its ties to Cuba and the Soviet Union. Ronald Reagan, who had assumed the American presidency in January 1981, accused the Sandinistas of importing Cuban-style socialism and aiding leftist guerrillas in El Salvador. The Reagan administration continued to view the Sandinistas as undemocratic despite the 1984 Nicaraguan elections being generally declared fair by foreign observers. Throughout the 1980s the Sandinista government was regarded as "Partly Free" by Freedom House, an organization financed by the U.S. government. 
 

On 4 January 1982, Reagan signed the top secret National Security Decision Directive 17 (NSDD-17), giving the CIA the authority to recruit and support the contras with $19 million in military aid. The effort to support the contras was one component of the Reagan Doctrine, which called for providing military support to movements opposing Soviet-supported, communist governments.

By December 1981, however, the United States had already begun to support armed opponents of the Sandinista government. From the beginning, the CIA was in charge. The arming, clothing, feeding and supervision of the contras became the most ambitious paramilitary and political action operation mounted by the agency in nearly a decade.

In the fiscal year 1984, the U.S. Congress approved $24 million in contra aid. However, since the contras failed to win widespread popular support or military victories within Nicaragua, opinion polls indicated that a majority of the U.S. public was not supportive of the contras, the Reagan administration lost much of its support regarding its contra policy within Congress after disclosure of CIA mining of Nicaraguan ports, and a report of the Bureau of Intelligence and Research commissioned by the State Department found Reagan's allegations about Soviet influence in Nicaragua "exaggerated", Congress cut off all funds for the contras in 1985 by the third Boland Amendment. The Boland Amendment had first been passed by Congress in December 1982. At this time, it only outlawed U.S. assistance to the contras "for the purpose of overthrowing the Nicaraguan government", while allowing assistance for other purposes. In October 1984, it was amended to forbid action by not only the Defense Department and the Central Intelligence Agency but all U.S. government agencies.

Nevertheless, the case for support of the contras continued to be made in Washington, D.C., by both the Reagan administration and the Heritage Foundation, which argued that support for the contras would counter Soviet influence in Nicaragua.

On 1 May 1985 President Reagan announced that his administration perceived Nicaragua to be "an unusual and extraordinary threat to the national security and foreign policy of the United States", and declared a "national emergency" and a trade embargo against Nicaragua to "deal with that threat". It "is now a given; it is true", the Washington Post declared in 1986, "the Sandinistas are communists of the Cuban or Soviet school"; that "The Reagan administration is right to take Nicaragua as a serious menace—to civil peace and democracy in Nicaragua and to the stability and security of the region"; that we must "fit Nicaragua back into a Central American mode" and "turn Nicaragua back toward democracy", and with the "Latin American democracies" "demand reasonable conduct by regional standard."

Soon after the embargo was established, Managua re-declared "a policy of nonalignment" and sought the aid of Western Europe, who were opposed to U.S. policy, to escape dependency on the Soviet Union. Since 1981 U.S. pressures had curtailed Western credit to and trade with Nicaragua, forcing the government to rely almost totally on the Eastern bloc for credit, other aid, and trade by 1985. In his 1997 study on U.S. low intensity warfare, Kermit D. Johnson, a former Chief of the U.S. Army Chaplains, contends that U.S. hostility toward the revolutionary government was motivated not by any concern for "national security", but rather by what the world relief organization Oxfam termed "the threat of a good example":

It was alarming that in just a few months after the Sandinista revolution, Nicaragua received international acclaim for its rapid progress in the fields of literacy and health. It was alarming that a socialist-mixed-economy state could do in a few short months what the Somoza dynasty, a U.S. client state, could not do in 45 years! It was truly alarming that the Sandinistas were intent on providing the very services that establish a government's political and moral legitimacy.

The government's program included increased wages, subsidized food prices, and expanded health, welfare, and education services. And though it nationalized Somoza's former properties, it preserved a private sector that accounted for between 50 and 60 percent of GDP.

Atrocities 
 
The United States began to support Contra activities against the Sandinista government by December 1981, with the CIA at the forefront of operations. The CIA supplied the funds and the equipment, coordinated training programs, and provided intelligence and target lists. While the Contras had little military successes, they did prove adept at carrying out CIA guerrilla warfare strategies from training manuals which advised them to incite mob violence, "neutralize" civilian leaders and government officials and attack "soft targets" — including schools, health clinics and cooperatives. The agency added to the Contras' sabotage efforts by blowing up refineries and pipelines, and mining ports. Finally, according to former Contra leader Edgar Chamorro, CIA trainers also gave Contra soldiers large knives. "A commando knife [was given], and our people, everybody wanted to have a knife like that, to kill people, to cut their throats". In 1985 Newsweek published a series of photos taken by Frank Wohl, a conservative student admirer traveling with the Contras, entitled "Execution in the Jungle":

The victim dug his own grave, scooping the dirt out with his hands ... He crossed himself. Then a contra executioner knelt and rammed a k-bar knife into his throat. A second enforcer stabbed at his jugular, then his abdomen. When the corpse was finally still, the contras threw dirt over the shallow grave — and walked away."Nicaraguan Contra Atrocities" West 57th, 1987, Video: 11:20

The CIA officer in charge of the covert war, Duane "Dewey" Clarridge, admitted to the House Intelligence Committee staff in a secret briefing in 1984 that the Contras were routinely murdering "civilians and Sandinista officials in the provinces, as well as heads of cooperatives, nurses, doctors and judges". But he claimed that this did not violate President Reagan's executive order prohibiting assassinations because the agency defined it as just 'killing'. "After all, this is war—a paramilitary operation", Clarridge said in conclusion. Edgar Chamorro explained the rationale behind this to a U.S. reporter. "Sometimes terror is very productive. This is the policy, to keep putting pressure until the people cry 'uncle'". The CIA manual for the Contras, Tayacan, states that the Contras should gather the local population for a public tribunal to "shame, ridicule and humiliate" Sandinista officials to "reduce their influence". It also recommends gathering the local population to witness and take part in public executions. These types of activities continued throughout the war. After the signing of the Central American Peace Accord in August 1987, the year war related deaths and economic destruction reached its peak, the Contras eventually entered negotiations with the Sandinista government (1988), and the war began to deescalate.

By 1989 the US backed Contra war and economic isolation had inflicted severe economic suffering on Nicaraguans. The US government knew that the Nicaraguans had been exhausted from the war, which had cost 30,865 lives, and that voters usually vote the incumbents out during economic decline. By the late 1980s Nicaragua's internal conditions had changed so radically that the US approach to the 1990 elections differed greatly from 1984. A united opposition of fourteen political parties organized into the National Opposition Union (Unión Nacional Oppositora, UNO) with the support of the United States National Endowment for Democracy. UNO presidential nominee Violeta Chamorro was received by President Bush at the White House.

The Contra war escalated over the year before the election. The US promised to end the economic embargo should Chamorro win.

The UNO scored a decisive victory on 25 February 1990. Chamorro won with 55 percent of the presidential vote as compared to Ortega's 41 percent. Of 92 seats in the National Assembly, UNO gained 51, and the FSLN won 39. On 25 April 1990, Chamorro assumed presidency from Daniel Ortega.

Illegal covert operations

With Congress blocking further aid to the Contras, the Reagan administration sought to arrange funding and military supplies by means of third countries and private sources. Between 1984 and 1986, $34 million from third countries and $2.7 million from private sources were raised this way. The secret contra assistance was run by the National Security Council, with officer Lt. Col. Oliver North in charge. With the third-party funds, North created an organization called The Enterprise, which served as the secret arm of the NSC staff and had its own airplanes, pilots, airfield, ship, operatives, and secret Swiss bank accounts. It also received assistance from personnel from other government agencies, especially from CIA personnel in Central America. This operation functioned, however, without any of the accountability required of U.S. government activities. The Enterprise's efforts culminated in the Iran–Contra Affair of 1986–1987, which facilitated contra funding through the proceeds of arms sales to Iran.

According to the London Spectator, U.S. journalists in Central America had long known that the CIA was flying in supplies to the Contras inside Nicaragua before the scandal broke. No journalist paid it any attention until the alleged CIA supply man, Eugene Hasenfus, was shot down and captured by the Nicaraguan army. Similarly, reporters neglected to investigate many leads indicating that Oliver North was running the Contra operation from his office in the National Security Council.

According to the National Security Archive, Oliver North had been in contact with Manuel Noriega, the military leader of Panama later convicted on drug charges, whom he personally met. The issue of drug money and its importance in funding the Nicaraguan conflict was the subject of various reports and publications. The contras were funded by drug trafficking, of which the United States was aware. Senator John Kerry's 1988 Committee on Foreign Relations report on Contra drug links concluded that "senior U.S. policy makers were not immune to the idea that drug money was a perfect solution to the Contras' funding problems".

The Reagan administration's support for the Contras continued to stir controversy well into the 1990s. In August 1996, San Jose Mercury News reporter Gary Webb published a series titled Dark Alliance, alleging that the contras contributed to the rise of crack cocaine in California.

Gary Webb's career as a journalist was subsequently discredited by the leading U.S. papers, The New York Times, the Washington Post, and the Los Angeles Times. An internal CIA report, entitled, "Managing a Nightmare", shows the agency used "a ground base of already productive relations with journalists" to help counter what it called "a genuine public relations crisis." In the 1980s, Douglas Farah worked as a journalist, covering the civil wars in Central America for the Washington Post. According to Farah, while it was common knowledge that the Contras were involved in cocaine trafficking, the editors of the Washington Post refused to take it seriously:

If you're talking about our intelligence community tolerating — if not promoting — drugs to pay for black ops, it's rather an uncomfortable thing to do when you're an establishment paper like the Post. If you were going to be directly rubbing up against the government, they wanted it more solid than it could probably ever be done.

An investigation by the United States Department of Justice also stated that their "review did not substantiate the main allegations stated and implied in the Mercury News articles." Regarding the specific charges towards the CIA, the DOJ wrote "the implication that the drug trafficking by the individuals discussed in the Mercury News articles was connected to the CIA was also not supported by the facts." The CIA also investigated and rejected the allegations.

Propaganda
During the time the US Congress blocked funding for the contras, the Reagan government engaged in a campaign to alter public opinion and change the vote in Congress on contra aid. For this purpose, the NSC established an interagency working group, which in turn coordinated the Office of Public Diplomacy for Latin America and the Caribbean (managed by Otto Reich), which conducted the campaign. The S/LPD produced and widely disseminated a variety of pro-contra publications, arranged speeches and press conferences. It also disseminated "white propaganda"—pro-contra newspaper articles by paid consultants who did not disclose their connection to the Reagan administration.

On top of that, Oliver North helped Carl Channell's tax-exempt organization, the National Endowment for the Preservation of Liberty, to raise $10 million, by arranging numerous briefings for groups of potential contributors at the premises of the White House and by facilitating private visits and photo sessions with President Reagan for major contributors. Channell in turn, used part of that money to run a series of television advertisements directed at home districts of Congressmen considered swing votes on contra aid. Out of the $10 million raised, more than $1 million was spent on pro-contra publicity.

International Court of Justice ruling

In 1984 the Sandinista government filed a suit in the International Court of Justice (ICJ) against the United States (Nicaragua v. United States), which resulted in a 1986 judgment against the United States. The ICJ held that the U.S. had violated international law by supporting the contras in their rebellion against the Nicaraguan government and by mining Nicaragua's harbors. Regarding the alleged human rights violations by the contras, however, the ICJ took the view that the United States could be held accountable for them only if it would have been proven that the U.S. had effective control of the contra operations resulting in these alleged violations. Nevertheless, the ICJ found that the U.S. encouraged acts contrary to general principles of humanitarian law by producing the manual Psychological Operations in Guerrilla Warfare (Operaciones sicológicas en guerra de guerrillas) and disseminating it to the contras. The manual, amongst other things, advised on how to rationalize killings of civilians and recommended to hire professional killers for specific selective tasks.

The United States, which did not participate in the merits phase of the proceedings, maintained that the ICJ's power did not supersede the Constitution of the United States and argued that the court did not seriously consider the Nicaraguan role in El Salvador, while it accused Nicaragua of actively supporting armed groups there, specifically in the form of supply of arms. The ICJ had found that evidence of a responsibility of the Nicaraguan government in this matter was insufficient. The U.S. argument was affirmed, however, by the dissenting opinion of ICJ member U.S. Judge Schwebel, who concluded that in supporting the contras, the United States acted lawfully in collective self-defence in El Salvador's support. The U.S. blocked enforcement of the ICJ judgment by the United Nations Security Council and thereby prevented Nicaragua from obtaining any actual compensation. The Nicaraguan government finally withdrew the complaint from the court in September 1992 (under the later, post-FSLN, government of Violeta Chamorro), following a repeal of the law requiring the country to seek compensation.

Human rights violations
Americas Watch, which subsequently became part of Human Rights Watch, accused the Contras of:
targeting health care clinics and health care workers for assassination
kidnapping civilians
torturing civilians
executing civilians, including children, who were captured in combat
raping women
indiscriminately attacking civilians and civilian houses
seizing civilian property
burning civilian houses in captured towns.

Human Rights Watch released a report on the situation in 1989, which stated: "[The] contras were major and systematic violators of the most basic standards of the laws of armed conflict, including by launching indiscriminate attacks on civilians, selectively murdering non-combatants, and mistreating prisoners."

In his affidavit to the World Court, former contra Edgar Chamorro testified that "The CIA did not discourage such tactics. To the contrary, the Agency severely criticized me when I admitted to the press that the FDN had regularly kidnapped and executed agrarian reform workers and civilians. We were told that the only way to defeat the Sandinistas was to ...kill, kidnap, rob and torture".

Contra leader Adolfo Calero denied that his forces deliberately targeted civilians:  "What they call a cooperative is also a troop concentration full of armed people. We are not killing civilians. We are fighting armed people and returning fire when fire is directed at us."

Controversy
Several articles were published by U.S. press, including by The Wall Street Journal and The New Republic, accusing Americas Watch and other bodies of ideological bias and unreliable reporting. The articles alleged that Americas Watch gave too much credence to alleged Contra abuses and systematically tried to discredit Nicaraguan human rights groups such as the Permanent Commission on Human Rights, which blamed the most human rights abuses on the Sandinistas.

In 1985, The Wall Street Journal reported:

Human Rights Watch, the umbrella organization of Americas Watch, replied to these allegations: "Almost invariably, U.S. pronouncements on human rights exaggerated and distorted the real human rights violations of the Sandinista regime, and exculpated those of the U.S.-supported insurgents, known as the contras ... The Bush administration is responsible for these abuses, not only because the contras are, for all practical purposes, a U.S. force, but also because the Bush administration has continued to minimize and deny these violations, and has refused to investigate them seriously."

Military successes and election of Violeta Chamorro
By 1986 the contras were besieged by charges of corruption, human-rights abuses, and military ineptitude. A much-vaunted early 1986 offensive never materialized, and Contra forces were largely reduced to isolated acts of terrorism. In October 1987, however, the contras staged a successful attack in southern Nicaragua. Then on 21 December 1987, the FDN launched attacks at Bonanza, Siuna, and Rosita in Zelaya province, resulting in heavy fighting. ARDE Frente Sur attacked at El Almendro and along the Rama road. These large-scale raids mainly became possible as the contras were able to use U.S.-provided Redeye missiles against Sandinista Mi-24 helicopter gunships, which had been supplied by the Soviets. Nevertheless, the Contras remained tenuously encamped within Honduras and were not able to hold Nicaraguan territory.

There were isolated protests among the population against the draft implemented by the Sandinista government, which even resulted in full-blown street clashes in Masaya in 1988. However, a June 1988 survey in Managua showed the Sandinista government still enjoyed strong support but that support had declined since 1984. Three times as many people identified with the Sandinistas (28%) than with all the opposition parties put together (9%); 59% did not identify with any political party. Of those polled, 85% opposed any further US aid to the Contras; 40% believed the Sandinista government to be democratic, while 48% believed it to be not democratic. People identified the war as the largest problem but were less likely to blame it for economic problems compared to a December 1986 poll; 19% blamed the war and US blockade as the main cause of economic problems while 10% blamed the government. Political opposition groups were splintered and the Contras began to experience defections, although United States aid maintained them as a viable military force.

After a cutoff in U.S. military support, and with both sides facing international pressure to bring an end to the conflict, the contras agreed to negotiations with the FSLN. With the help of five Central American Presidents, including Ortega, the sides agreed that a voluntary demobilization of the contras should start in early December 1989. They chose this date to facilitate free and fair elections in Nicaragua in February 1990 (even though the Reagan administration had pushed for a delay of contra disbandment).

In the resulting February 1990 elections, Violeta Chamorro and her party the UNO won an upset victory of 55% to 41% over Daniel Ortega. Opinion polls leading up to the elections divided along partisan lines, with 10 of 17 polls analyzed in a contemporary study predicting an UNO victory while seven predicted the Sandinistas would retain power.

Possible explanations include that the Nicaraguan people were disenchanted with the Ortega government as well as the fact that already in November 1989, the White House had announced that the economic embargo against Nicaragua would continue unless Violeta Chamorro won. Also, there had been reports of intimidation from the side of the contras, with a Canadian observer mission claiming that 42 people were killed by the contras in "election violence" in October 1989. Sandinistas were also accused of intimidation and abuses during the election campaign. According to the Puebla Institute, by mid-December 1989, seven opposition leaders had been murdered, 12 had disappeared, 20 had been arrested, and 30 others assaulted. In late January 1990, the OAS observer team reported that “a convoy of troops attacked four truckloads of UNO sympathizers with bayonets and rifle butts, threatening to kill them." This led many commentators to conclude that Nicaraguans voted against the Sandinistas out of fear of a continuation of the contra war and economic deprivation.

In popular culture 

In The Last Thing He Wanted, a journalist for the fictitious Atlanta Post stops her coverage of the 1984 U.S. Presidential election to care for her dying father.  In the process, she inherits his position as an arms dealer for Central America, and learns of the Iran–Contra affair.
American Dad references the Contras in the episode "Stanny Slickers 2: The Legend of Ollie's Gold"
The Americans, the TV series features an episode on KGB agents infiltrating a Contra camp.
American Made, a film loosely based on Barry Seal's life.
In the Amazon Prime TV series The Boys the American superhero team Payback is clandestinely deployed to Nicaragua in 1984 to assist Contra units supported by the CIA.
Carla's Song, a fictional film by Ken Loach set in part against the backdrop of the conflict in Nicaragua.
 Contra – While it is unclear whether the game was deliberately named after the Nicaraguan Contra rebels, the ending theme of the original game was titled , after the adversaries of the real-life Contras.
Contra, the second studio album by the American indie rock band Vampire Weekend, released in January 2010 on XL Recordings. It debuted at number one on the US Billboard 200. The album title is intended as a thematic allegory and a complex reference to the Nicaraguan counter-revolutionaries. The song "I Think Ur a Contra" is from this album.
Sandinista!, an album by The Clash, features songs about The Contras in Nicaragua. It was released in 1980. The song "Washington Bullets" is from this album.  
City Hunter, a manga, the main protagonist, Ryo Saeba, was raised as a contra guerilla fighter in Central America.
Student Visas, a song by Corb Lund from the album "Horse Soldier! Horse Soldier!", is about US Clandestine soldiers (such as SFOD-D and CIA Paramilitary) interacting with Contras in El Salvador and Nicaragua.
Fragile The song is a tribute to Ben Linder, an American civil engineer who was killed by the Contras in 1987 while working on a hydroelectric project in Nicaragua.
Narcos: Mexico features an episode where Felix has to deliver guns to Nicaragua with Amado and a CIA operative for Salvador Nava and Mexico's Minister of Defense
The Mighty Quinn involves a CIA operative and a Latino right-wing assassin trying to recover large sums of untraceable US dollars which were to fund anti-communist counter-revolution on the mainland (Nicaragua is not mentioned).
Snowfall a TV series following several characters, including an undercover CIA officer facilitating cocaine smuggling into the US on the behalf of the Nicaraguan Contras and his connection to a 20-year-old drug dealer in Los Angeles in the mid-1980s, the early days of the crack cocaine epidemic.
The Last Narc, a 2020 documentary about the kidnapping and murder of DEA agent Kiki Camarena by Mexican drug cartels, ends up covering parts of the Iran-Contra scandal.

See also
Anti-communism
CIA and Contras cocaine trafficking in the US
Operation Charly
Psychological Operations in Guerrilla Warfare
Reagan Doctrine
Role of women in Nicaraguan Revolution
United States involvement in regime change in Latin America
Latin America–United States relations
Foreign interventions by the United States
Cold War

Notes

References

Asleson, Vern. (2004) Nicaragua: Those Passed By. Galde Press 
Belli, Humberto. (1985). Breaking Faith: The Sandinista Revolution and Its Impact on Freedom and Christian Faith in Nicaragua. Crossway Books/The Puebla Institute.
Bermudez, Enrique, "The Contras' Valley Forge: How I View the Nicaraguan Crisis", Policy Review, The Heritage Foundation, Summer 1988.
Brody, Reed. (1985). Contra Terror in Nicaragua: Report of a Fact-Finding Mission: September 1984 – January 1985. Boston: South End Press. .
Brown, Timothy. (2001). The Real Contra War: Highlander Peasant Resistance in Nicaragua. University of Oklahoma Press. .
Chamorro, Edgar. (1987). Packaging the Contras: A Case of CIA Disinformation. New York: Institute for Media Analysis. ; .
Christian, Shirley. (1986) Nicaragua, Revolution in the Family. New York: Vintage Books.
Cox, Jack. (1987) Requiem in the Tropics: Inside Central America. UCA Books.
Cruz S., Arturo J. (1989). Memoirs of a Counterrevolutionary. (1989). New York: Doubleday.
Dickey, Christopher. (1985, 1987). With the Contras: A Reporter in the Wilds of Nicaragua. New York: Simon & Schuster.
Garvin, Glenn. (1992). Everybody Had His Own Gringo: The CIA and the Contras. Washington: Brassey's.

Gugliota, Guy. (1989). Kings of Cocaine Inside the Medellin Cartel. Simon and Schuster.
Horton, Lynn. Peasants in Arms: War and Peace in the Mountains of Nicaragua, 1979–1994. (1998). Athens: Ohio University Center for International Studies.
International Court of Justice (1986) 
International Court of Justice (IV) (1986) 
Hamilton, Lee H. et al. (1987) "Report of the Congressional Committees Investigating the Iran/Contra Affair"
Johns, Michael "The Lessons of Afghanistan: Bipartisan Support for Freedom Fighters Pays Off", Policy Review, Spring 1987.
Kirkpatrick, Jeane J. (1982) Dictatorships and Double Standards. Touchstone. 
Miranda, Roger, and William Ratliff. (1993, 1994) The Civil War in Nicaragua: Inside the Sandinistas. New Brunswick, NY: Transaction Publishers.
Moore, John Norton (1987). The Secret War in Central America: Sandinista Assault on World Order. University Publications of America.
Pardo-Maurer, Rogelio. (1990) The Contras, 1980–1989: A Special Kind of Politics. New York: Praeger.
Persons, David E. (1987) A Study of the History and Origins of the Nicaraguan Contras. Nacogdoches, Texas: Total Vision Press. Stephen Austin University Special Collections.
Sklar, H. (1988) "Washington's war on Nicaragua" South End Press.

External links
Confessions of a Contra: How the CIA Masterminds the Nicaraguan Insurgency by The New Republic, 5 August 1985
The Contras and U.S. Funding from the Dean Peter Krogh Foreign Affairs Digital Archives
U.S. Policy Towards the Contras from the Dean Peter Krogh Foreign Affairs Digital Archives
"The World Stopped Watching", a documentary film directed by Peter Raymont. White Pine Pictures, 2003.
"The Contras, Cocaine, and Covert Operations" – National Security Archive.
US administration disregarding the UN verdict Video provided by BBC.
 When the AK-47s Fall Silent, by Timothy Brown

 
Anti-communist organizations
Central Intelligence Agency operations
CIA activities in the Americas
Cold War conflicts
Cold War rebellions
Counter-revolutionaries
Guerrilla organizations
History of Nicaragua
History of the foreign relations of the United States
Iran–Contra affair
Anti-communist terrorism
Nicaraguan anti-communists
Nicaraguan Revolution
Nicaragua–United States relations
Rebellions in North America
Terrorism in Nicaragua
Wars involving the United States
Dirty wars
Reagan administration controversies